Ignazio Cocchiere (born 19 September 1987) is an Italian footballer who plays as a midfielder or forward for Belgian Second Division Amateurs club SC Eendracht Aalst. He signed for SC Eendracht Aalst in 2019 after playing for FCV Dender EH for 3 years, having previously been one of the crowd favourites for the club Royal Union Saint-Gilloise, having played an integral part in their promotion to the Belgian Second Division during the 2014–15 season. Quickly after his arrival at FCV Dender EH he started making an impact at his new club and with his total of 18 goals he contributed greatly to the successful 2016–17 season. Even though the 2017-2018 season is less successful for FCV Dender EH, Cocchiere still managed to score 12 goals. In 2018-2019 he managed to score another 13 goals, after the 2018-2019 season, he went to SC Eendracht Aalst who were relegated to the Second Division Amateurs.

Football career

Youth career 
Born in Varese, Lombardy, Cocchiere signed his first professional contract mid-2006 for top Serie A club Internazionale at the age of 18, where he joined the reserve team. Like most of his new Primavera under-20 reserve teammates, Cocchiere received a first-team shirt number of no.56. At the Inter reserves he played in a very strong youth team, featuring Mario Balotelli, Jonathan Biabiany and Leonardo Bonucci among others, resulting in winning the Primavera league.

Lega Pro 
After graduation from the Reserves, Cocchiere left for Pizzighettone in late-August 2007. As the club also signed several experienced players, the young Cocchiere featured only in two matches that season. In 2008–09 Lega Pro Prima Divisione, he was signed by Pro Patria. Cocchiere had few chances to play for the first team and the fact that he combined his football career with studying at university meant he looked for opportunities elsewhere.

Switzerland 
Cocchiere found the opportunity to combine both careers when he was signed by Swiss Challenge League club Nyon in 2010, and he simultaneously enrolled in Political Science at the University of Geneva. As a result of the Swiss maximum number of foreign players he was initially loaned out to Swiss 1. Liga club Baulmes. Here he had a successful run of games playing an attacking right-back and contributed to the club's great form with an impressive number of 7 goals in 12 games. His goal scoring record attracted the attention of several first league clubs and this contributed to the decision of Nyon to call him back to the club and add him to the squad in summer of 2010. However, after only a handful appearances partly due to a rare injury in his career, Cocchiere was released in summer of 2011 when he decided not to accept any of the received offers from Swiss Second Division clubs and to return to Italy to finish his university degree. Cocchiere then returned to Italy to finish his master's degree at Universita Cattolica del Sacro Cuore and signed for Serie D club Gallaratese. At the club he scored 5 goals in 11 games. On 4 January 2012, he was signed by Caronnese, where he stayed for one season during which he finished his degree.

Belgium 
Cocchiere moved to Brussels where he signed for Royal Union Saint-Gilloise and combined his football career with a career working for the European Parliament. After some very successful seasons playing for Union and scoring some crucial memorable goals, Cocchiere started featuring less in the starting eleven during season 2015-2016, much to the disliking of many of the fans. This eventually lead to his departure and Cocchiere found a new challenge at FCV Dender EH, signing a one-year contract with an option of one more year. He quoted the reputation and great infrastructure of the club as some of the reasons for signing. Here he quickly found his rhythm and form; being voted as 'Man of the Match' by Dender fans on frequent occasions and scoring 12 goals in his first 16 official games. His successful first season, seeing him netting 20 goals, led the club to offering him an improved contract in April 2017, shortly before the league's playoffs. In the current season Cocchiere has scored thirteen goals, despite the disappointing league position of his club, Cocchiere has scored 13 goals so far this season.

Personal life

European Parliament 
Ignazio Cocchiere has always combined his professional football career with academic activities, studying at university in many of the countries he played. Having successfully combined his studies with practicing his sport full-time, he continued combining both careers also after graduation. In Brussels he found a job working at the European Parliament, where he has worked for more than four years now. In his interview with Eurosport on 25 April 2017, he recommended all young football players to keep an alternative career path in mind and stressed that his job in the European Parliament was another reason he expects to be playing football in Belgium the years to come. As a result of playing for local cult club Royale Union Saint-Gilloise and working in the so-called 'Brussels Bubble', Cocchiere has become a well-known and respected figure in the local scene, resulting regularly in a lot of media coverage.

References

External links
 Swiss Football League Profile 

Italian footballers
A.C. Legnano players
Inter Milan players
A.S. Pizzighettone players
Aurora Pro Patria 1919 players
FC Stade Nyonnais players
Association football forwards
Sportspeople from the Province of Varese
1987 births
Living people
S.G. Gallaratese A.S.D. players
S.C. Caronnese S.S.D. players
Footballers from Lombardy